Coulterville may refer to:

 Coulterville, California
 Coulterville, Illinois
 Coulterville, Pennsylvania
 Coulterville, Ontario, within the town of Caledon